Hearst is a surname. Notable people with the surname include:

Amanda Hearst (born 1984), American socialite, activist, fashion model, and heiress
Anne Hearst (born 1956), American socialite and philanthropist
Cary Ann Hearst (born 1979), American musician
Gabriela Hearst (born 1976), Uruguayan-born American fashion designer
Garrison Hearst (born 1971), American football player
George Hearst (1820–1891), American businessman and politician
George Randolph Hearst (1904–1972), American socialite
George Randolph Hearst Jr. (1927–2012), American mass media owner and billionaire
George Randolph Hearst III (born 1955), American publisher and billionaire
James Hearst (1900–1983), American poet, philosopher, and academic
John E. Hearst (born 1935), American-Austrian chemist
John Randolph Hearst (1909–1958), American business executive and socialite
John Augustine Hearst (born 1952), American media executive and philanthropist
Kathleen McCartney Hearst, American triathlete
Lydia Hearst (born 1984), American model, actress, and socialite
Marti Hearst, American computer scientist
Michael Hearst (born 1972), American musician
Millicent Hearst (1882–1974), American vaudeville performer and wife of William Randolph Hearst
Patty Hearst (born 1954), now known as Patricia Hearst Shaw, American newspaper heiress, occasional actress, and kidnap victim
Phoebe Hearst (1842–1919), American philanthropist, feminist, and suffragist
Phoebe Hearst Cooke (1927–2012), American businesswoman and philanthropist
Randolph Apperson Hearst (1915–2000), American mass media owner and socialite
Rick Hearst (born 1965), American actor
Stephen Hearst (1919–2010), Austrian-born British television and radio executive
Tom Hearst, American racing driver
William Howard Hearst (1864–1941), Conservative premier of the Canadian province of Ontario
William Randolph Hearst (1863–1951), American newspaper magnate, founder of Hearst Corporation, and builder of Hearst Castle
William Randolph Hearst II (1908–1993), editor-in-chief of Hearst Newspapers after his father's death  
William Randolph Hearst III (born 1949), president of the William Randolph Hearst Foundation since early 2003

See also
Hirst (surname)
Hurst (surname)